Dewi Chien (born 9 March 1992) is a Taiwanese singer and actress. She is member of musical duo Dears. She is known for her role as Tao Min-min in the 2015 film Our Times.

Filmography

Television series
 The Devil Punisher (2020) as Seven Star Sword Spirit / Xiao-qi

Films 
 Fall in Love at First Kiss (2019)
 Come Back to Your World (2016)
 Our Times (2015) as Tao Min-min
 Secret Piano (2012)

References

External links

1992 births
Living people
Actresses from Taichung
Taiwanese film actresses
Taiwanese television actresses
21st-century Taiwanese actresses
21st-century Taiwanese singers
21st-century Taiwanese women singers